"It's A Good Thing" is a 1986 single by That Petrol Emotion.

Track listing 7"

Track listing 12"

Personnel 
 Steve Mack: Vocals
 Seán O`Neill: Guitar
 Raymond O`Gorman: Guitar, vocals, keyboards
 Damian O`Neill: Bass, vocals, keyboards
 Ciaran McLaughlin: Drums, percussion

References

1986 songs
That Petrol Emotion songs
Songs written by John O'Neill (guitarist)